The Adrenalina Skateboard Marathon is a series of international longboard racing events. Each race is on  course on a skateboard that must be pushed by foot. The event is owned and operated by Adrenalina / Nata Media Inc.

History
The first Adrenalina Skateboard Marathon took place on November 6, 2010, at Gulfstream Park in Hallandale Beach, Florida. One hundred and twenty-five people participated in the event and there were three hundred people total in attendance. A large international field was drawn, due to the fact it was the largest prize purse to date, including a ten thousand dollar grand prize. Jeff Vyain was the first winner of the event. He set a world record with a time of 1:40:58.

Results

Current day
The Adrenalina Skateboard Marathon has been held in San Diego, California, since 2012.

The 2018 Adrenalina Skateboard Marathon is taking place in San Diego, CA on Saturday Nov 10th.

The 2016 Adrenalina Skateboard Marathon took place on November 20 and the 2017 skateboard marathon took place on November 11, both in Fiesta Island, San Diego, California.

A long-term goal for the race is to create awareness and a perception that longboard skateboarding can be used as a viable and legal alternative mode of transportation.

Committed to not only fitness and endurance, the Adrenalina Skateboard Marathon will also support the community. A portion of each registration fee will be donated to Summit4StemCell.

Summit4StemCell (S4SC) is a grass roots, volunteer fund raising organization supporting non-embryonic stem cell research conducted by Jeanne Loring Ph.D. and Melissa Houser, M.D. S4SC operates under the nonprofit status of the Parkinson's Association of San Diego (PASD). Summit4StemCell inspired a partnership with PASD, The Scripps Clinic in La Jolla and the Scripps Research Institute in an effort to further the fight against Parkinson's through this promising research.

References

External links
 Adrenalina Skateboard Marathon Official Website

Skateboarding